Apricot brandy can refer to a liquor (or Eau de Vie) distilled from fermented apricot juice or a liqueur made from apricot flesh and kernels.

Brands
Various brands of both types of products exist, including:

 Zwack Kecskeméti Barack Pálinka, from Kecskemét, Hungary, a true Apricot Brandy (or Eau de Vie) made from fermented Apricot juice
 Marillenschnaps or Marillenbrand, also an Eau de Vie made from apricots; it is produced mainly in the Wachau region of Austria
 Maraska Apricot, from Croatia, a liqueur
 Meruňkovice, typical for Moravia region of Czech Republic
 Marie Brizard Apry, from France, a liqueur
 Sweet Lucy, a Bourbon/apricot liqueur mix
 Meaghers apricot Brandy, from Canada, a liqueur
 Sơn Tinh Apricot Rượu, from Vietnam
 Apricotine

See also 
 Fruit brandy
 Alcohol

References 

 
 Internet Wines and Spirits

Brandies
Apricots